Uncle Jesse may refer to any of several real or fictional people, including:

 Jesse Katsopolis, from the television series Full House
 Jesse Duke (Dukes of Hazzard), a character from the TV series and movie The Dukes of Hazzard
 Jesse K. Dubois, American politician